Bulbophyllum rheedei is a species of orchid in the genus Bulbophyllum in section Cirrhopetalum.

References
The Bulbophyllum-Checklist
The Internet Orchid Species Photo Encyclopedia

rheedei